Alia Hafeez (born 1929) was an Afghan educator. She belonged to the generation of pioneer women who attained public positions in Afghan society after the reforms of Mohammed Daoud Khan.

She was born in Kabul. She graduated from Malalay High School (1948) and from Women's College and received master's degree in education in the United States. She spoke Dari, Pashto, French and English.

She worked as a teacher at Malalay and as an inspector for Primary Schools in Kabul. She was president for the Institute of Education from 1969 to 1970. 
She was a professor in psychology at the collage of Letters and Humanities within the Kabul University, and the director of the Girls' Dormitory there.

She attended the 1964 UNESCO conference at Tehran, and the Philippines (1965), in London in 1973, and the International women's congress ln east Berlin in 1975.

References 

 M. Saed: Women in Afghanistan history
 Rahimi Fahima. (1977, with 1~ update of 1985 by Nancy Hatch Dupree), Women in Afghanistan /Frauen in Afghanistan, Kabul

1929 births
Possibly living people
20th-century Afghan educators
20th-century Afghan women